Shubha is an Indian actress who acted prominently in Malayalam films. She was a lead actress during the late 1970s and early 1980s. She also acted in Telugu, Kannada, Tamil, and Hindi films. She was the second lead in the cult Kannada classic Naagarahaavu (1972). For this, she received Karnataka State Film Award for Best Supporting Actress for the year 1972–73.

Personal life
She was born to Telugu film actor and director Vedantam Raghavayya and Suryaprabha, who was also an actress, in Krishna District, Andhra Pradesh, India. She has five sisters and a brother. Her aunt Pushpavalli (Hindi actor Rekha's mother) was also a Telugu actress and was married to Gemini Ganeshan. That makes Shubha a cousin of Hindi film actress Rekha.

Filmography

Malayalam

 Varavaay (2000)
 Avalude Janmam (1994)
 Sarovaram (1993) as Balamani
 Amina Tailors (1991) as Pathumma
 Avalkkoru Janmam Koodi (1990)) as Maheswariyamma
 Samarppanam (1987)
 Kaathirippinte Thudakkam (1987)
 Mangalya Charthu (1987) as Vasanthy
 Adukkan Entheluppam (1986) as Susimol
 Niramulla Ravukal (1986) as Radha's mother
 Ahalya (1986)
 Kaiyum Thlayum Purathidaruthe (1985) ... Leela
 Idanilangal (1985) as Madhavi
 Adhyayam Onnu Muthal (1985) as Soudamini
 Vilichu Vilikettu (1985)
 Gaayathridevi Ente Amma (1985)
 Snehicha Kuttathinu (1985) as Saraswathi
 Eeran Sandhya (1985) as Sumathi
 Vellarikka Pattanam (1985)
 Thirakkil Alppa Samayam (1984)
 Aagraham (1984)
 Panchavadi Palam (1984) as  Poothana
 Aalkkoottathil Thaniye (1984) as Vishalam
 NH 47 (1984) as Ramani 
 Manithali (1984) as Mariyamma 
 Thacholi Thankappan (1984) as Sujatha
  Manasse Ninakku Mangalam (1984) as Meenakshi
  Parannu Parannu Parannu (1984) as Beauty Parlour Owner
 Swapnalokam (1983)
 Rugma (1983) as Gracy
 Maniyara (1983) as Ramla
 Thavalam (1983) as Thankamma
 Enne Njan Thedunnu (1983) as Malu
 Lekhayude Maranam Oru Flashback (1983) as Vishalakshi
 Nathi Muthal Nathi Vare (1983) as Jayasree
 Paalam (1983)
 Oru Madapravinte Katha (1983)
 Arabikkadal (1983)
 Vaarikuzhi (1982)
 Mylanchi (1982) as Suhara  
 Keni (1982) as Rajani
 Kilukilukkam (1982)
 Chiriyo Chiri (1982) as Suhara
 Ee Nadu (1982) as Sreedevi
 Ithiri Neram Othiri Karyam (1982) as Annamma
Niram Marunna Nimishangal (1982)
 Vazhikal Yaathrakkar (1981)
 Chaata (1981) as Damayanthi
 Vaadaka Veettile Athidhi (1981)
 Sanchari (1981) as Shubha
 Theekkali (1981)
Njaan Ninne Marakkilla (Dubbed version of Naa Ninna Mareyalare) - 1981
 Sphodanam (1981) as Gouri
 Thaaraavu (1981) as Neeli
 Swarangal Swapnagal (1981) as Usha
 Dhruvasangamam (1981) as Rajalakshmi
 Manassinte Theerthayathra (1981) as Arundhati
 Vayal (1981) as Karthu
 Meen (1980) as Sara
 Kochu Kochu Thettukal (1980) as Jayasree
 Air Hostess (1980) as Sandhya
 Shishirathil Oru Vasantham (1980)
 Aniyaatha Valakal (1980) as Mini
 Idi Muzhakkam as Chirutha
 Karnan 
 Youvanam Daaham (1980)
 Agni Vyooham (1979)
 Ward No.7 (1979)
 Vijayanum Veeranum (1979) as Malini
 Kazhukan (1979) as Malathi
 Rakthamillatha Manushyan (1979) as Sumathi
 Enikku Njaan Swantham (1979) as Meenu
 Pambaram (1979) as Shanthi
 Ezhunirangal (1979) as Bindu
 Adipapam (1979)
 Pancharathnam (1979)
 Aayiram Vasanthangal (1979)
 Iniyethra Sandhyakal (1979)
 Bandhanam (1978) as Sarojini
 Adimakkachavadam (1978) as Ponnamma 
 Aanayum Ambariyum 
 Aasramam
 Tiger Salim
 Karnaparvam (1978)
 Aarum Anyaralla (1978) as Dancer Girigiribhai
 Nakshathrangale Kaaval (1978)
 Balapareekshanam (1978) as Raji
 Pattalam Janaki (1977)
 Udyaanalakshmi (1976)
 Devi Kanyakumari (1974)
 Gayathri (1973)
 Ollathu Mathi (1967)

Tamil

 Pattikada Pattanama (1972) - debut in Tamil as Rakkamma
 Baghdad Perazhagi (1973)
 Sollathaan Ninaikkiren (1973) as Manjula
 Ponvandu (1973) as Rukmani
 Vijaya (1973)
 Maanikka Thottil (1974)
 Raja Nagam (1974) as Margaret
 Anbai Thedi (1974) as Radha
 Ezhaikkum Kaalam Varum (1975)
 Unga Veettu Kalyanam (1975)
 Manidhanum Dheivamagalam (1975)
 Enakkoru Magan Pirappan (1975)
 Navarathinam (1977) as Muthamma
 Gaslight Mangamma (1977)
 Thirukkalyanam (1978)
 Thanga Rangan (1978)
 Kaali (1980)
 Chinna Poove Mella Pesu (1987)
 Poovizhi Raja (1988)

Telugu

 Kabeer Das (2003)
 Mama Bagunnava (1997)
 Annamayya  (1997)
 Hitler (1997)
 Chilakapachcha Kaapuram (1995)
 Sarigamalu (1994)
 Mechanic Alludu (1993) as Parvathy
 Gharana Mogudu (1992) as Raju's mother 
 Antham (1992)
 April 1st Vidudhala (1991) as Krupa Mani
 Ontari Poratam (1989)
 Donga Kollu (1988) as Tulasamma
 Yuddha Bhoomi (1988)	
 Sirivennela (1986) 
 Magadheerudu (1986)
 Shravana Meghalu (1986)
 Apoorva Sahodarulu (1986)
 Donga (1985)
 Maharaju (1985)
 Vijetha (1985)
 Rustum (1984) as Gowri
 Illalu Priyuralu (1984)
 Kalavari Samsaram (1982) as Sarala
 Karthika Deepam (1979)
 Mana Voori Pandavulu (1978)
 Tharam Marindi (1977)
 Jyothi (1976)
 Jeevana Jyoti (1975)
 O Seeta Katha (1974)
 Palletoori Bava (1973) as Rangamma
 Guduputaani (1972)

Kannada

 Mahabharatha (1997)
 Kalyana Rekhe (1993)
 Chikkejamanru (1992)
 Bangaradantha Maga (1991)
 Rudra Tandava (1990)
 Raja Kempu Roja (1990)
 Mruthyunjaya (1990)
 Ajay Vijay (1990)
 Mangalya (1990)
 Gajapathi Garvabhanga (1989)
 Nanjundi Kalyana (1989)
 Ravana Rajya (1987)
 Onde Goodina Hakkigalu (1987)
 Jeevana Jyothi (1987)
 Manamecchida Hudugi (1986)
 Madhvacharya (1986)
 Anand (1986)
 Paduvaaralli Pandavaru (1978)
 Galate Samsara (1977)
 Maagiya Kanasu (1977)
 Mugdha Manava (1977)
 Naa Ninna Mareyalare (1976)
 Makkala Bhagya (1976)
 Phalitamsha (1976)
 Bhagya Jyothi (1975)
 Naagarahaavu (1972)

References

External links
 
 Shubha at MSI
 

Actresses in Malayalam cinema
Indian film actresses
Actresses in Tamil cinema
Actresses in Kannada cinema
Actresses in Hindi cinema
Actresses in Telugu cinema
Year of birth missing (living people)
Living people
20th-century Indian actresses
21st-century Indian actresses
People from Krishna district
Actresses from Andhra Pradesh
People from Vijayawada
Actresses from Vijayawada